Many Black Dahlia suspects, or persons of interest, have been proposed as the unidentified killer of Elizabeth Short, nicknamed the "Black Dahlia", who was murdered in 1947. Many conspiracy theories have been advanced, but none have been found to be completely persuasive by experts, and some are not taken seriously at all.

The murder investigation by the Los Angeles Police Department was the largest since the murder of Marion Parker in 1927, and involved hundreds of officers borrowed from other law enforcement agencies. Sensational and sometimes inaccurate press coverage, as well as the nature of the crime, focused intense public attention on the case. As the case continues to command public attention, many more people have been proposed as Short's killer, much like London's Jack the Ripper murders.

Original suspects
Because of the complexity of the case, the original investigators treated every person who knew Elizabeth Short as a suspect who had to be eliminated. Hundreds of people were considered suspects and thousands were interviewed by police.

About 60 people confessed to the murder, mostly men but including a few women. However, 24 people were considered to be viable suspects by the Los Angeles County District Attorney:

 Carl Balsiger
 C. Welsh
 Sergeant "Chuck" (name unknown)
 John D. Wade
 Joe Scalis
 James Nimmo
 Maurice Clement
 A Chicago police officer
 Salvador Torres Vera
 Dr. George Hodel
 Marvin Margolis
 Glenn Wolf
 Michael Anthony Otero
 George Bacos
 Francis Campbell
 "Queer Woman Surgeon" Christine Reynolds 35
 Dr. Paul DeGaston
 Dr. A. E. Brix
 Dr. M. M. Schwartz
 Dr. Arthur McGinnis Faught
 Dr. Patrick S. O'Reilly
 Mark Hansen
 Benjamin "Bugsy" Siegel (unlikely but was still considered) 

People dismissed as suspects early in the investigation include Daniel S. Voorhees.

Later suspects
While some of the original 24 suspects were discounted, new ones have arisen. At present the following suspects are discussed by various authors and experts:

Walter Bayley
Bayley was a Los Angeles surgeon who lived one block south of the vacant lot in which Short's body was found, until he left his wife in October 1946. His daughter was a friend of Short's sister Virginia, and had been the matron of honor at her wedding. When Bayley died in January 1948, his autopsy showed that he was suffering from a degenerative brain disease. After his death, his widow alleged that his mistress knew a "terrible secret" about Bayley and was made the main beneficiary upon his death as a result. Bayley was never a suspect in the case, but many medical doctors and others with medical training were. In secret testimony, Detective Harry Hansen, one of the original investigators, told the 1949 Los Angeles County grand jury that in his opinion the killer was a "top medical man" and "a fine surgeon." Bayley was 67 years old at the time of the murder, had no known history of violence or criminal activity of any kind, and is not known to have met Short, even though his daughter was a friend of Short's oldest sister.

When Larry Harnisch, a Los Angeles Times copy editor and writer, began studying the case in 1996, he eventually concluded that Bayley could be Short's killer. Although critics of Harnisch's theory question whether Bayley's mental and physical condition at the time of the murder would have been consistent with the commission of this type of crime, the original investigators' theory that the body was cut in half because the killer wasn't strong enough to move it intact partially answers this objection. Harnisch theorizes that Bayley's neurological deterioration contributed to his alleged violence against Short. Some have suggested that the secret Bayley's mistress was blackmailing him with was that he had performed abortions, then a crime. However, there is no evidence that either Bayley or his associates performed abortions. Author James Ellroy endorsed Harnisch's theory in the 2001 film James Ellroy's Feast of Death.

Among Harnisch's behavioral/psychological evidence: Bayley's neurodegenerative condition was known to produce violent behavior in otherwise passive individuals; his surgical specializations included mastectomies, hysterectomies, and the surgical removal of fat; in conversation with Bayley's former receptionist, Harnisch discovered that he and his mistress would, at dinnertime, watch movies of surgeries and autopsies.

In devising his theory, Harnisch consulted retired FBI profiler John E. Douglas, who advised that the very public location of the dump site was significant, since the killer had the ability to transport the body to a more remote site, where it may not have been discovered; the site was one block away from property owned by Bayley's estranged wife Ruth. Douglas also advised that the facial lacerations indicated personal anger towards the victim: Short would often falsely tell men that she had a son who had died tragically; Bayley did, in fact, have a son who was struck by a car and killed at age 11. The deceased child's birthday was January 13; Short's body was discovered on January 15.

Norman Chandler
Donald Wolfe's 2005 book The Black Dahlia Files: The Mob, the Mogul, and the Murder That Transfixed Los Angeles names Norman Chandler, publisher of the Los Angeles Times from 1945-1960, as a suspect in the murder. In a complicated scenario involving multiple perpetrators, Wolfe claims that Chandler impregnated Short while she was working as a call girl for the notorious Hollywood "madam" Brenda Allen, which led to her murder at the hands of gangster Bugsy Siegel. Wolfe's claim that Short was a prostitute is at odds with the Los Angeles County district attorney's files, which plainly state that she was not, as Wolfe asserts, pregnant.

Leslie Dillon
Dillon was a 27-year-old bellhop, aspiring writer, and former mortician's assistant who became a suspect when he began writing to Los Angeles Police Department psychiatrist Dr. J. Paul De River in October 1948. Dillon was living in Florida at the time of his correspondence with De River, but had formerly lived in Los Angeles. He read a story about the case in a True Detective-style magazine in which De River was quoted, and wrote to De River regarding his theories on the case. In his correspondence, he mentioned an intense interest in sadism and sexual violence in hopes of authoring a book on the subject. Dillon offered up one of his friends, Jeff Connors, as a likely suspect. Over the course of their correspondence, De River began to believe that Connors did not exist and that Dillon had committed the murder himself.

In December 1948, Dillon agreed to meet with De River and was given the choice of one of three cities: Los Angeles; Phoenix, Arizona; or Las Vegas, Nevada. Dillon expressed reservations about Los Angeles, and chose Las Vegas instead. De River and undercover LAPD officers met Dillon in Las Vegas for a couple of days and then proceeded to drive back to California. Once there, Dillon and De River traveled to San Francisco to unsuccessfully look for Connors. When Dillon offered up intimate details about the crime, he was taken into custody by the undercover officers and transported to Los Angeles. After this happened, Dillon sailed a postcard out a hotel window with a plea for help on it; it was discovered by a passerby and turned in to local authorities.

Police soon discovered that Connors did indeed exist; his real name was Artie Lane. Lane had lived in Los Angeles at the time of the murder and was employed by Columbia Studios, a favorite hangout of Short's, as a maintenance man. However, contrary to popular belief, Dillon could not be conclusively placed in San Francisco at the time of the murder. In fact, police never could account for Dillon's whereabouts between January 9 and January 15, 1947. Dillon later filed a $100,000 claim against the City of Los Angeles, but dropped the lawsuit after it emerged he was wanted by Santa Monica police for robbery. Los Angeles Times reporter Larry Harnisch disputes this and says that Dillon did in fact receive a financial settlement from the City of Los Angeles. The incident led to a 1949 grand jury investigation of police handling of the Black Dahlia case and some other unsolved murders. The publication of the Long Beach Police The Rap Sheet said that a former member of LA's Gangster Squad investigating the case  believed that Leslie Dillon was the killer and when Dillon returned to his home state of Oklahoma was able to avoid extradition to California because Dillon's relative was the governor of Oklahoma. Some speculated that Dillon's ex-wife Georgie Stevenson was related to former Illinois governor Adlai Stevenson, who contacted the Oklahoma governor on Dillon's behalf, although none of these relations have been verified.

In 2004, De River's daughter, Jacque Daniel, published a book called The Curse of the Black Dahlia, in which she expressed her belief that her father had been unfairly maligned for the Dillon affair.

Joseph A. Dumais
Dumais, a 29-year-old soldier stationed at Fort Dix, New Jersey, confessed to Short's murder a few weeks after it occurred. Although this "breakthrough" was quickly dismissed by the original investigators, the Los Angeles press covered it enthusiastically until it was revealed that Dumais had been at Fort Dix at the time of the murder. Dumais was cleared of any involvement in the crime, although he continued to claim he killed Short each time he was arrested for various offenses, well into the 1950s.

Mark Hansen

Hansen was a Hollywood nightclub owner at whose home Short lived, either as a paying boarder or as a guest, on several occasions between May 1946 and October 1946. Hansen's girlfriend Ann Toth shared a room with Short in this house, which was near Hansen's nightclub. Short called Hansen from San Diego on January 8, making him one of the last people known to have spoken to her. The Los Angeles County District Attorney's files indicate that Hansen made contradictory statements to authorities about the nature of this conversation. An address book embossed with Hansen's name was among Short's belongings mailed to the Los Angeles Examiner after her murder by someone claiming to be the killer. The address book belonged to Hansen, but he had never used it; Short had been using it as her own. The D.A.'s files also indicate that Hansen had tried to seduce Short but was rebuffed. He was one of the first serious suspects in the case and he was still a prime suspect as late as 1951. Hansen was also linked to three other suspects, each of whom was a medical doctor: Dr. Patrick S. O'Reilly, Dr. M. M. Schwartz, and Dr. Arthur McGinnis Faught. Buz Williams, a retired detective with the Long Beach Police Department, wrote an article for the LBPD newsletter The Rap Sheet in 2000 on Elizabeth Short's murder. Williams' father Richard F. Williams and his friend Con Keller were both members of LA's Gangster Squad investigating the case. Keller believed Mark Hansen was the killer and said Hansen was Swedish and had spent some time at Sweden's Medical Surgical School (Hansen was actually born in Denmark) which would explain the precise dissection of Short's body. Keller also said that Hansen held elaborate parties at his Hollywood boarding house and members of the Los Angeles Police Department along with the Chief of Detectives Thad Brown and his brother Finis Brown attended and later aided Hansen in a cover up. Williams mentioned that Hansen owned a Ford Lincoln-Mercury car lot on Hollywood Boulevard and his LAPD friends were later coincidentally driving around town in brand new Lincoln cars.

Hansen died of natural causes in 1964. No charges were ever brought against him. He had no criminal record and no known history of violence. LAPD Police Chief William Worton told the Los Angeles Examiner that there was absolutely no case against Hansen. Hansen's great granddaughter Helen Alexis Yonov was interviewed for Piu Eatwell's upcoming documentary on the Black Dahlia for NBC Peacock Productions. Popular accounts of the Black Dahlia case often portray Hansen as having connections to organized crime, but there is no evidence of this.

George Hodel
Dr. George Hill Hodel, Jr. came under police scrutiny in October 1949, when his 14-year-old daughter, Tamar, accused him of molesting her. Despite three witnesses testifying that they had seen Hodel having sex with Tamar, he was acquitted in December 1949. The trial led the LAPD to include Hodel, a physician specializing in sexually transmitted diseases, among its many suspects in the Dahlia case. Police put Hodel under surveillance from February 18 to March 27, 1950, to ascertain whether he could be implicated in the murder. In the surviving transcripts of microphone recordings, Hodel was heard making highly incriminating statements.

The secretary referred to was Ruth Spaulding, who police had previously suspected of being murdered by Hodel in 1945. He was present when Spaulding overdosed and had burnt some of her papers before police were called. The case was dropped owing to lack of evidence, but documents were later found that indicated Spaulding was about to publicly accuse Hodel of intentionally misdiagnosing patients and billing them for laboratory tests, medical treatment, and prescriptions not needed. Hodel's son, former LAPD homicide detective Steve Hodel, believes Short may have been one of his father's patients.

In the final report to the grand jury, dated February 20, 1951, Lt. Frank Jemison of the Los Angeles County D.A.'s office wrote:

Doctor George Hodel, M.D. 5121 Fountain [Franklin] Avenue, at the time of this murder had a clinic at East First Street near Alameda. Lillian DeNorak [Lenorak] who lived with this doctor said he spent some time around the Biltmore Hotel and identified the photo of victim Short as a photo of one of the doctor's girl friends. Tamar Hodel, fifteen-year-old daughter, stated that her mother, Dorothy Hodel, has told her that her father had been out all night on a party the night of the murder and said, "They'll never be able to prove I did that murder." Two microphones were placed in this suspect's home (see the log and recordings made over approximately three weeks time which tend to prove his innocence. See statement of Dorothy Hodel, former wife). Informant Lillian DeNorak [Lenorak] has been committed to the State Mental Institution at Camarillo. Joe Barrett, a roomer at the Hodel residence cooperated as an informant. A photograph of the suspect in the nude with a nude identified colored model was secured from his personal effects. Undersigned identified this model as Mattie Comfort, 3423½ South Arlington, Republic 4953. She said that she was with Doctor Hodel sometime prior to the murder and that she knew nothing about his being associated with the victim. Rudolph Walthers, known to have been acquainted with victim and also with suspect Hodel, claimed he had not seen victim in the presence of Hodel and did not believe that the doctor had ever met the victim. The following acquaintances of Hodel were questioned and none were able to connect the suspect with murder: Fred Sexton, 1020 White Knoll Drive; Nita Moladero, 1617½ North Normandy [Normandie]; Ellen Taylor 5121 Fountain Avenue; Finlay Thomas, 616½ South Normandy [Normandie]; Mildred B. Colby, 4029 Vista Del Monte Street, Sherman Oaks, this witness was a girlfriend of Charles Smith, abortionist friend of Hodel, Turin Gilkey, 1025 North Wilcox; Irene Summerset, 1236¼ North Edgemont; Norman Beckett, 1025 North Wilcox; Ethel Kane, 1033 North Wilcox; Annette Chase, 1039 North Wilcox; Dorothy Royer, 1636 North Beverly Glenn. See supplemental reports, long sheets and hear recordings, all of which tend to eliminate this suspect.

The report, from which the above excerpt was taken, was submitted at the completion of the D.A.'s investigation of Hodel and at least 21 other suspects.

In 2003, Steve Hodel published a book, Black Dahlia Avenger; A Genius for Murder, in which he claimed his father, who died in 1999, had murdered Short and was responsible for other unsolved killings over two decades. Steve had seen two pictures in his father's photo album that he claims resemble Short, although her family insists they are not of her and many other observers have failed to see the resemblance. Since beginning his investigation, Steve located and identified one of the photographic subjects as a former friend of George Hodel. The other photograph remains unidentified. Steve claims he was unaware at the time that his father had been a suspect, although his sister Tamar was friends with Janice Knowlton, author of her own book, Daddy Was The Black Dahlia Killer, and case documents make it clear that Steve's parents and many of their associates knew George Hodel was a suspect. After reviewing the information presented in Steve's book, Head Deputy D.A. Stephen Kay proclaimed the case solved, but others have noted that he had formed this conclusion by treating Steve's many disputed assertions as established fact. Detective Brian Carr, the LAPD officer in charge of the Black Dahlia case at the time of Steve's briefing, said in a televised interview that he was baffled by Kay's response. In a September 2006 television interview, Carr added, "I don't have the time to either prove or disprove Hodel's investigation. I am too busy working on active cases." In 2009, Hodel published Most Evil: Avenger, Zodiac, and the Further Serial Murders of Dr. George Hill Hodel, in which he claimed that his father was also the Zodiac Killer.

Author James Ellroy endorsed Steve Hodel's theory in 2004, but has since refused to discuss the case publicly. Steve Hodel maintains a website wherein he continues to update the case with additional discovered information.

George Knowlton
Little reliable information is available on George Knowlton, except that he lived in the Los Angeles area at the time of the Black Dahlia murder and died in an automobile accident in 1962.

In the early 1990s, George Knowlton's daughter Janice began claiming that she had witnessed her father murdering Elizabeth Short, a claim she based largely on "recovered memories" that surfaced during therapy for depression after a hysterectomy. Based on these recovered memories, Knowlton published Daddy Was The Black Dahlia Killer with veteran crime writer Michael Newton in 1995. In the book, Knowlton, a former professional singer and owner of a public relations company, alleged that her father had been having an affair with Elizabeth Short and that Short was staying in a makeshift bedroom in their garage, where she suffered a miscarriage. George Knowlton allegedly murdered Short in the garage and bisected her in the sink, then forced his then ten-year-old daughter Janice to accompany him when he disposed of the body. According to Knowlton, Short was a sex worker and a procurer of children for a child trafficking ring. Knowlton claimed that a former member of the Los Angeles Sheriff's Department told her that her father was considered a suspect in the case by that agency, but this claim is unsupported by the public documents that have been released in the case. She claimed the same source told her that future LAPD chief and California politician Ed Davis and Los Angeles County District Attorney Buron Fitts were suspects in the murder as well. The Los Angeles Times wrote in 1991:

Los Angeles Police Detective John P. St. John, one of the investigators who had been assigned to the case, said he has talked to Knowlton and does not believe there is a connection between the Black Dahlia murder and her father. "We have a lot of people offering up their fathers and various relatives as the Black Dahlia killer," said St. John, better known as Jigsaw John. "The things that she is saying are not consistent with the facts of the case.

Nevertheless, Westminster, California police took her claims seriously enough to dig up the grounds around her childhood home there, looking for evidence. They found nothing to tie George Knowlton to any crime.

Knowlton's sister has since stated on Amazon.com's listing for Daddy Was The Black Dahlia Killer that after the publication of Knowlton's book, Tamar Hodel, daughter of George Hodel and sister of Steve Hodel, contacted Knowlton and the two women remained "email pals for several years."

Knowlton also made claims prefiguring those of Black Dahlia Files author Donald Wolfe. In 1999, she claimed in various public forums that Norman Chandler participated in a coverup of the murder. Knowlton claimed that on Halloween 1946, she was sold at the age of nine as a child prostitute to a Pasadena satanic sex cult. She frequently alleged that she was sexually abused by a long list of dead movie stars and other notables, including Norman Chandler, Gene Autry (whose name she continually misspelled as Autrey), Arthur Freed, and Walt Disney.

Knowlton became somewhat infamous within online Black Dahlia discussion communities for her insistence that the LAPD was engaged in a conspiracy to discredit her story in order to conceal their knowledge of George Knowlton's involvement. She was so abusive in her Usenet posts that Pacific Bell canceled her account in 1999. On March 5, 2004, Janice Knowlton died of an overdose of prescription drugs in what was deemed a suicide by the Orange County, California, coroner's office.

In 2009, Newton wrote that Janice Knowlton's relatives confirmed her father George was capable of violent abuse and further reported of his "boasts of [having committed] unprosecuted homicides". However, Newton also admitted that Janice's allegations against her father were entirely circumstantial and lacked substantial corroboration.

Robert M. "Red" Manley
The last person seen with Elizabeth Short before her disappearance, Manley was the LAPD's top suspect in the first few days after the killing. After two polygraph tests and a sworn alibi, Manley was set free. He also identified Short's handbag purse and one of her shoes after they were discovered in a trashcan on January 25, 1947, several miles from the murder scene. Manley, who had been discharged from the army for mental disability, subsequently suffered a series of nervous breakdowns and claimed to be hearing voices. As a result, he was committed to Patton State Hospital by his wife in 1954. He died on January 16, 1986. The coroner attributed his death to an accidental fall.

Patrick S. O'Reilly
According to Los Angeles district attorney files, Dr. Patrick  O'Reilly was a medical doctor who knew Short through nightclub owner Mark Hansen. According to the files, at the time of the murder O'Reilly was a good friend of Hansen and frequented Hansen's nightclub. Files also state that O'Reilly "attended sex parties at Malibu" with Hansen. O'Reilly had a history of sexually motivated violent crime. He had been convicted of assault with a deadly weapon for "taking his secretary to a motel and sadistically beating her almost to death apparently for no other reason than to satisfy his sexual desires without intercourse," the files state. Further, the files indicate that O'Reilly's right pectoral had been surgically removed, which investigators found similar to the mutilation of Short's body. The files indicate that O'Reilly had once been married to the daughter of an LAPD captain who was also a bisexual.

Jack Anderson Wilson (a.k.a. Arnold Smith)
Wilson was a lifelong petty criminal and alcoholic who was interviewed by author John Gilmore while Gilmore was researching his book Severed. After Wilson's death, Gilmore named Wilson as a suspect owing to his alleged acquaintance with Short. Prior to Wilson's death, however, Gilmore made an entirely different claim to the Los Angeles Herald-Examiner in a story appearing January 17, 1982. While Severed says that homicide Detective John St. John was about to "close in" on Wilson based on the material Gilmore provided, St. John told the Herald-Examiner in the same article that he was busy with other killings and would review Gilmore's claims when he got time. As reliable sources of information about the case, such as the FBI files and portions of the Los Angeles district attorney files, have become publicly available, statements about Short and the murder attributed to Wilson in Severed and supposedly tying him to the crime have not been borne out as accurate. Severed also claims Wilson was involved in the murder of Georgette Bauerdorf. Severed and many other sources based on Severed erroneously claim that Short and Bauerdorf knew each other in Los Angeles, supposedly because they were both hostesses at the same nightclub. In reality, by the time Short arrived in Los Angeles in 1946, Bauerdorf had been dead for two years and the nightclub had been closed for a year. Wilson was never a suspect until Gilmore brought him to the attention of authorities.

Wilson figures in Donald Wolfe's book The Mob, The Mogul, And The Murder That Transfixed Los Angeles. Wolfe hypothesizes that Wilson was present at Short's murder and claims a connection between Wilson and gangster Bugsy Siegel through some small-time gangsters Wilson supposedly associated with. He was also a member of the military.

Female suspects
Although the vast majority of suspects in the case were male, authorities did not rule out the possibility of a female killer. One theory held that, because Short had checked her baggage, including her clothing and cosmetics, a week before she died, she must have been staying with another woman (who presumably would have lent Short the essentials) during the intervening time. Another theory was that the assailant bisected Short's body because he or she was not strong enough to move it in one piece. One of the first people to confess to the murder was a WAC sergeant stationed in San Diego. Authorities took the confession seriously enough to investigate and found it groundless. Another suspect is referred to simply as "Queer Woman Surgeon" in the Los Angeles district attorney's files on the case. Newspaper stories at the time implied that Short was a lesbian or bisexual, but the district attorney files state bluntly that Short "had no use for queers."

Celebrity suspects

Woody Guthrie

Folk singer Woody Guthrie was one of the many suspects in the murder, according to the Los Angeles County district attorney's files and Ramblin' Man: The Life and Times of Woody Guthrie written by Ed Cray and published in 2004 by W.W. Norton. According to Cray, Guthrie drew police attention because of some sexually explicit letters and tabloid clippings he sent to a Northern California woman who he was allegedly stalking. The mailings disturbed the recipient so much that she showed them to her sister in Los Angeles, who contacted the police. Guthrie was quickly cleared of involvement in the murder, but various authorities attempted to prosecute him, with minor success, on charges related to sending prohibited materials through the mail.

Orson Welles
In her 2000 book, Mary Pacios, a former neighbor of the Short family in Medford, Massachusetts, suggested filmmaker Orson Welles as a suspect. Pacios bases this theory on such factors as Welles's volatile temperament and his creation of mannequins three months before Short's death that supposedly featured lacerations virtually identical to those inflicted on Short. The mannequins were used in the "house of mirrors" set for The Lady from Shanghai, a film Welles was making with his ex-wife Rita Hayworth around the time of the murder. The scenes containing the set were deleted from the film by Harry Cohn. In one of Short's last letters home, her older sister Virginia claimed she had written that a movie director was going to give her a screen test.

Pacios also cites Welles' familiarity with the site where the body was found and the magic act he performed to entertain soldiers during World War II. She believes that the bisection of the body was part of the killer's signature and an acting out of the perpetrator's obsession. Welles applied for his passport on January 24, 1947, the same day the killer mailed a packet to Los Angeles newspapers. Welles left the country for an extended stay in Europe 10 months after the murder without completing the editing of Macbeth, the film he was both directing and starring in. Despite persistent attempts by Republic Pictures to get him to return to complete the film, he refused. According to Pacios, witnesses she had interviewed state that Welles and the victim both frequented Brittingham's restaurant in Los Angeles during the same time period and waitresses believed Short was going out with someone at Columbia Pictures. Welles was never a suspect in the investigation.

Bugsy Siegel 
Los Angeles mobster Benjamin "Bugsy" Siegel was allegedly a suspect in the murder investigation of Short. The reason why he was a suspect is unclear, especially since Siegel was more concerned with the Flamingo Hotel and Casino at the time and he was known to be a "lady's man" not a "lady's killer." Also, Siegel was involved with Chicago Outfit starlet, and his on-off girlfriend Virginia Hill. Still, according to Don Wolfe's book The Black Dahlia Files: The Mob, the Mogul, and the Murder That Transfixed Los Angeles, Siegel was the actual murderer. It has also been surmised that if Siegel had any involvement with the Dahlia murder, he would have sent Mickey Cohen or one of his other henchmen. Yet another theory was that the murder may have been an attempt to frame Siegel by Jack Dragna, who wanted revenge for Siegel's attacks on Dragna's business interests since his arrival in the 1930s.

References

External links
 Steve Hodel's official website

1947 murders in the United States
Suspects
Lists of suspected criminals
Murder in California
Suspected serial killers